Taghrid Hamadeh (born 1 June 1988) is a Lebanese football and futsal player who plays as a defender for Lebanese club BFA.

Hamadeh represented Lebanon internationally in both football and futsal; she is the football national team joint-most capped player alongside Sara Bakri, with 22 games between 2006 and 2015.

Club career
Hamadeh has played for Zouk Mosbeh's women's futsal team in Lebanon, and for ÓBerytus in the Lebanese Women's Football League during the 2019–20 season, scoring four goals.

International career
Hamadeh has been capped for Lebanon at senior level in both football and futsal. In football, she represented Lebanon at the 2014 AFC Women's Asian Cup qualification in 2013, playing three games and scoring a goal against Kuwait.

In futsal, Hamadeh played for Lebanon at the 2012 WAFF Women's Futsal Championship and the 2018 AFC Women's Futsal Championship.

Career statistics

International

Honours
Lebanon
 WAFF Women's Championship third place: 2007

See also
 List of Lebanon women's international footballers

References

External links
 
 

1988 births
Living people
People from Aley District
Lebanese women's footballers
Lebanese women's futsal players
Women's association football defenders
Zouk Mosbeh SC footballers
ÓBerytus players
Beirut Football Academy players
Lebanese Women's Football League players
Lebanon women's international footballers
Lebanese Muslims